Ammonium vanadate may refer to:

 Ammonium metavanadate (ammonium trioxovanadate(V)), NH4VO3
 Ammonium orthovanadate (ammonium tetraoxovanadate(V)), (NH4)3VO4, a compound related to Ammonium metavanadate
 Ammonium hexavanadate, (NH4)2V6O16, a compound related to Ammonium metavanadate